Talal Abdulkarim Aklan is a Yemeni politician who was the acting Prime Minister of the Houthis government
until 4 October 2016.

Between 2015 and 2016, he was a member of the Supreme Revolutionary Committee.

References

Yemeni politicians
Government ministers of Yemen
Living people
Prime Ministers of Yemen
Year of birth missing (living people)